Cylicocyclus is a genus of nematodes belonging to the family Strongylidae.

The genus has cosmopolitan distribution.

Species

Species:

Cycliocyclus insigne 
Cycliocyclus leptosomatum
Cycliocyclus nassatus

References

Nematodes